"Lambada", also known as "Chorando Se Foi (Lambada)" or "Llorando Se Fue (Lambada)" (both meaning 'crying, he/she went away' in Portuguese and Spanish, respectively), is a song by French-Brazilian pop group Kaoma. It featured guest vocals by Brazilian vocalist Loalwa Braz, and was released as the first single from Kaoma's debut album, Worldbeat (1989). The accompanying music video, filmed on Cocos beach in the city of Trancoso, in the state of Bahia, Brazil featured the Brazilian child duo Chico & Roberta.

The song in Portuguese was a mix cover of the 1986 hit "Chorando Se Foi" by Márcia Ferreira (with lyrics translated to Portuguese) and the Cuarteto Continental hit "Llorando Se Fue" (the first upbeat version of the song introducing the accordion), released in 1984 through the Peruvian record label INFOPESA and produced by Alberto Maraví; both songs were adapted from the 1981 Bolivian song "Llorando se fue" by Los Kjarkas.

At the time of release, "Lambada" was regarded as the most successful European single in the history of CBS Records, with sales of 1.8 million copies in France and more than 4 million across Europe. Overall, "Lambada" sold 5 million copies worldwide in 1989 alone according to the New York Times. However, the Kaoma group did not credit the original song of Los Kjarkas, turning their version into plagiarism and ending with lawsuits that would be won by the original authors of the song, the Bolivian group and their Portuguese-language co-authors.

Background and release
The lyrics and music of Kaoma's "Chorando Se Foi (Lambada)" were an unauthorized translation of the song "Llorando se fue", originally composed, performed  and recorded by the Bolivian Andean folk group Los Kjarkas in 1981. The song's lyrics and music had been lawfully registered by the founding members of Los Kjarkas, Gonzalo and Ulises Hermosa, in 1981 at the Bolivian Institute of Culture (IBC) and in 1985 at Germany's Music and Authors Society (GEMA). The unauthorized copy by Kaoma, which was credited to fictitious composer Chico de Oliveira, led to a successful 1990 lawsuit by Los Kjarkas against Kaoma's producer Jean-Claude Bonaventure. In 1991, French court ruled that co-writers Márcia Ferreira and José Ari were the authors of the Portuguese translation for Kaoma's version. Nowadays, "Chorando Se Foi (Lambada)" is credited to the Hermosa brothers (as authors), Alberto Maraví, Márcia Ferreira and José Ari.

According to Gonzalo, Los Kjarkas had based "Llorando Se Fue" on a small, nostalgic Andean melody. Their song was written in a sad and slow Afro-Bolivian Saya rhythm.

Prior to Kaoma's 1989 release of the song, several covers of "Llorando se fue" had been released as dance tracks:

1984 – Cuarteto Continental from the LP Fiesta de Cumbias
1984 – Armonia 10 from the LP El Chinchorro, Vol. 2
1984 – Sexteto Internacional from the LP Mas Sexteto
1984 – Tropical Pingüino
1984 – Wilkins from the album Una Historia Importante – 15 Grandes Exitos
1984 – Chacalón y la Nueva Crema from the EP Llorando se fue/Llorando y sufriendo
1984 – Grupo Trebol from the LP Tropical Andino
1985 – Freddy Roland from the LP Chicha Up
1985 – Juan "Corazón" Ramón from the album Cada Día Mejor
1985 – Don Medardo y sus Player from the album Lo Mejor del Año, Vol.4
1985 – Vico y su Grupo Karicia from the LP Voz y sentimiento
1986 – Márcia Ferreira
1986 – Los Graduados from the album Flor de un día
1986 – Pastor López from the album Cumbia Universal
1987 – Sonora Andacollo from the album Norte Tropical – Lambada
1988 – Los Hermanos Rosario from the album Otra Vez
1988 – Ana Morena from the compilation album Baila Baila Baila, Vol. 2
1988 – Tropicalismo Apache from the album Exitos Quemantes
1989 – Los Flamers from the album Gran Reventon Gran, Vol. 5

In 1984, an upbeat version of "Llorando Se Fue", introducing the accordion, was released by the Peruvian group Cuarteto Continental, whose arrangements (produced by Alberto Maraví) were later copied by Kaoma. The first Portuguese translation and recording of "Llorando Se Fue" – as "Chorando Se Foi" – was released by Brazilian singer Márcia Ferreira in 1986 under her third album.

The French managers Olivier Lorsac (aka Olivier Lamotte d'Incamps) and Jean Georgakarakos formed the band Kaoma in France after Lorsac was exposed to lambada in March 1988 during his visit to Porto Seguro, Bahia, Brazil. Lorsac and Georgakarakos bought the musical rights to over 400 lambada songs from the Brazilian music publisher Continental. Lorsac admitted he and Georgakarakos had heard a "remarkably similar" song by the Hermosa brothers, later recognized by French court to be Márcia Ferreira's hit cover version.In France of 1989, Kaoma's song was used in a television advertisement for Orangina.

Chart performance
"Lambada" became a worldwide summer hit, selling over 5 million copies in 1989 and was part of the Lambada dance craze. It reached No. 1 in eleven different charts, as well as No. 4 in both the UK Singles Chart and Irish Singles Chart, No. 5 on the Australia ARIA Singles Chart, and in 1990 it reached No. 46 in the US Billboard Hot 100, becoming one of the best known Brazilian songs of all time.

As of 1991, combined sales of the album and the single have reached one million records sold in Italy.

"Chorando Se Foi (Lambada)" was the 37th best-selling single of the United Kingdom during 1989. In France, where it topped the chart for 12 weeks and sold almost two million copies, the single was No. 1 on the year-end list.

Music video
The accompanying music video for "Lambada" was filmed on stage on Tago Mago Island in the Mediterranean Sea and on Cocos Beach in the city of Trancoso, Bahia, Brazil. It featured the Brazilian child duo Chico & Roberta as love interests. As a semi-plot, Roberta's father does not want her to hang out with Chico, but Loalwa mends the situation among the three.

Motion picture
The song was licensed by producer Richard L. Albert for his film The Forbidden Dance after he saw Kaoma perform in a Los Angeles club. Not only was Kaoma's rendition used, but the song was also performed by Kid Creole and the Coconuts on screen, with English lyrics.

Cover versions, samples and mentions
The song "Sochna Kya" from the 1990 Hindi film Ghayal copied the melody of "Chorando Se Foi (Lambada)".

Also in 1990, experimental rock band Sun City Girls covered the song for their album Torch of the Mystics with the title "The Shining Path."

The Japanese singer Akemi Ishii released a cover version in Japanese on 21 March 1990. It peaked at No. 16 on the Oricon charts and was re-recorded in 2011.

The Hong Kong DJ Aling Choi Ling Ling released a cover version ”人生嘉年華“ in Cantonese on 1990.

In 1994, the song was used in the Arcade video game 'Best of Best' by the korean company SunA.

Elephant Man released Hate Mi in 2004 which copies the melody of "Chorando Se Foi (Lambada)"

In France, "Chorando Se Foi (Lambada)" was covered by another group, Carioca, which peaked only at No. 22 on 9 September 1989 and remained in the charts for nine weeks. It was also covered, around that time, by other Brazilian singers, such as Fafá de Belém, whose 1985 album Aprendizes da Esperança was an early exponent of the lambada rhythm. In that same year, a cover by Regina appeared on the album Lambada Tropical (credited to Chico Mendés) and on the compilation albums Max Mix 9 and Hits '89.

The Turkish singer Cengiz Coşkuner recorded a version of "Chorando Se Foi (Lambada)", with lyrics written by Ülkü Aker, it featured on his album Seni Gidi Seni & Kapris Yapma, which was released in 1990. Another Turkish singer, Rüya Çağla, wrote and recorded a version for use as the title track of her album Lambada, also released in 1990.

Ivete Sangalo recorded a version of "Chorando Se Foi (Lambada)" for her album As Super Novas, released as its third single, becoming number 1 in Brazil. She also recorded the song on her second live album.

Mariana Seoane recorded "Chorando Se Foi (Lambada)" in Spanish for her 2007 album Está de Fiesta... Atrévete!!.

Seikima-II frontman Demon Kakka recorded "Chorando Se Foi (Lambada)" in Japanese/Spanish for his 2008 album GIRLS' ROCK Hakurai.

The 2011 Jennifer Lopez single "On the Floor" sampled either "Lambada" by Kaoma, or the original "Llorando Se Fue" by Los Kjarkas. "On The Floor" reached No. 3 in the Billboard Hot 100. "On The Floor" itself would later be sampled by UK drill rappers A1 x J1 and Tion Wayne for their song "Night Away (Dance)", released in March 2022.

Formats and track listings
7" single CBS
 "Lambada" – 3:28
 "Lambada" (instrumental) – 3:48

 "Lambada" (DJ Petro Panayoti aka Mixmaster Remix) 1989 – 4:50

12" maxi CBS
 "Lambada" (extended version) – 6:44
 "Lambada" (instrumental version) – 3:48
 "Lambada" (DJ Stigma-Berveni Remix) – 3:55

 "Lambada" (DJ Petro Panayoti Club Remix) 2019 – 6:00

Charts

Weekly charts

Year-end charts

Certifications and sales

Lambada 3000 (Gregor Salto remix)

In July 2009, a new Summer remixed version of the track by house and latin jazz DJ Gregor Salto called "Lambada 3000"  (billed as Gregor Salto & Kaoma) was released in the Benelux. Loalwa Braz, the original singer of the song, was asked to provide new vocals for the remix. The track became Salto's second Top 20 hit in the Dutch Top 40, and third entry in the chart, peaking at #12. Its music video was shot on Curaçao and premiered in June 2009.

Track listings and formats

Charts

References

1988 debut singles
EMI Records singles
Kaoma songs
CBS Records singles
Epic Records singles
Number-one singles in Austria
European Hot 100 Singles number-one singles
SNEP Top Singles number-one singles
Number-one singles in Germany
Number-one singles in Italy
Dutch Top 40 number-one singles
Number-one singles in Norway
Number-one singles in Portugal
Number-one singles in Sweden
Number-one singles in Switzerland
Portuguese-language songs
1988 songs

fr:Llorando se fue#Version de Kaoma